Strandbags is an Australian and New Zealand retailer of handbags, wallets, luggage, backpacks and other personal accessories.

The chain has over 270 stores around Australia. 

It also has 27 stores in New Zealand, including 11 in Auckland.

History

In September 2019, Strandbags opened a new larger concept flagship store at Melbourne's Chadstone Shopping Centre, as part of a strategy to expand the size of major stores. It was one of a number of new stores to open in the mall.

In October 2019, Strandbags owner Michael Lewis invested $8 million in direct-to-consumer luggage brand July.

During the start of the COVID-19 pandemic in Australia and COVID-19 pandemic in New Zealand, stores closed for at least six weeks.

In August 2020, Scentre Group locked out some Strandbags stores over a rental dispute. The decision affected stores at Westfield centres in Australia. The dispute was resolved and the stores were allowed to reopen.

In May 2021, the New Zealand Commerce Commission laid charges against Strandbags under the Fair Trading Act 1986, accusing it of misleading consumers about discounts. The Commission accused the company of marketing discounts against a regular price that had never been used. Consumer NZ alleged similar tactics were also used by other retailers; the Commission warned other retailers against doing so.

In October 2021, Strandbags relaunched its website following a four month redevelopment process. It followed the appointment of new Chief of Technology and Head of Online the previous year.

References

External links
 Official website

Personal accessory retailers of Australia
Personal accessory retailers of New Zealand
Australian companies established in 1927
Retail companies established in 1927